Dominik Družeta (born 3 June 1996) is a Croatian judoka. He is the 2017 European bronze medalist in the –81 kg division.

References

External links
 

1996 births
Croatian male judoka
Living people
European Games competitors for Croatia
Judoka at the 2019 European Games
21st-century Croatian people